The Toronto Mendelssohn Choir is a Canadian large vocal ensemble based in Toronto, Ontario. It was co-founded in 1894 by Augustus S. Vogt and W. H. Hewlett to celebrate the opening of the Massey Hall. The ensemble was originally an extension of the choir of Jarvis St. Baptist Church in Toronto which Vogt directed and Hewlett accompanied. It is named after the German composer, Felix Mendelssohn.

The choir has 150 voices, including a professional core of 20 singers along with auditioned amateur singers. The chamber-sized, 70-voice Mendelssohn Singers is formed from the choir.

The choir performs secular and sacred choral masterpieces in its own annual concert series, as well as regular performances with the Toronto Symphony Orchestra. The choir has toured in the United States and Europe, performing at the Carnegie Hall, Royal Albert Hall, Notre Dame Cathedral, the Kennedy Center, and major venues in Vienna, Salzburg and Prague. In January 2010, the choir travelled to Vancouver to perform in the 2010 Cultural Olympiad.

The Toronto Mendelssohn Choir's outreach programs include Singsation Saturday Choral Workshops for singers, and an annual Choral Conductors' Symposium for emerging conductors.

Recordings
Since 1926, the Toronto Mendelssohn Choir has made or been featured in 20 recordings, the most popular being Handel's Messiah with Kathleen Battle, Florence Quivar, John Aler, Samuel Ramey and the Toronto Symphony Orchestra, under the direction of Sir Andrew Davis (1987). The choir has appeared on movie soundtracks including Agnes of God and the award-winning soundtrack to Schindler's List (uncredited) under the direction of John Williams. Recent albums under conductor Noel Edison include Berlioz: Requiem (1998) and A Festival of Carols (2006).

Conductors
Augustus Vogt (1894–1917)
Herbert A. Fricker (1917–42)
Sir Ernest MacMillan (1942–57)
Frederick Silvester (1957–60)
Walter Susskind (1960–64)
Elmer Iseler (1964–97)
Noel Edison (1997–2018)
Jean-Sébastien Vallée (2021– )

References

External links
Official website

Canadian choirs
Musical groups from Toronto
Musical groups established in 1894
1894 establishments in Ontario